OpenTuition.com is an online learning site, providing free online training in accountancy and financial services. Founded by John Moffat in 2008, it is based in Riga, Latvia.

OpenTuition has over 500,000 registered students both in the UK and overseas who are studying for the professional accountancy qualifications:  ACCA,  CIMA  and AAT.

OpenTuition publishes free electronic text books and streams free lectures for the following ACCA examinations: Fundamental Level: BT  Business and Technology, MA Management Accounting, FA Financial Accounting, LW Corporate and Business Law, PM Performance Management, TX Taxation, FR Financial Reporting, AA Audit and Assurance, and FM Financial Management.

The Professional level: Essentials (compulsory) exams: SBL Strategic Business Leader; SBR Strategic Business Reporting; Options (two papers required): AFM Advanced Financial Management; APM Advanced Performance Management; ATX Advanced Taxation; AAA Advanced Audit and Assurance.

OpenTuition is a registered CIMA tuition provider, free e-books, tests and lectures are published for the CIMA Certificate in Business Accounting and CIMA Professional Qualification.

OpenTuition study resources include such subjects as: financial accounting, management accounting, financial reporting, taxation, company law, audit and assurance and financial management.

OpenTuition have discussion forums for all ACCA papers, OBU, CIMA, FIA, AAT and others.

OpenTuition received international recognition among accountancy professionals in London, winning two prizes, the first in 2010 as the best accountancy learning site and in 2011 for the best accountancy study resource.

References

Education in Latvia
Educational websites
Latvian websites
Accounting
Distance education institutions
Educational organisations based in Latvia